Ryan Harrison (born 6 December 1985) is an English football goalkeeper who last played for Harare City in Zimbabwe.

He is the son of Mark Harrison.

Career
In April 2018, Harrison joined Harare City in Zimbabwe on a one-year contract, where his father was working as a technical director and later manager. He decided to leave the club on 1 February 2019.

References

External links

1985 births
Living people
Footballers from Northampton
English footballers
Expatriate soccer players in South Africa
England semi-pro international footballers
Association football goalkeepers
Swansea City A.F.C. players
Canvey Island F.C. players
Hastings United F.C. players
Wrexham A.F.C. players
Forest Green Rovers F.C. players
Havant & Waterlooville F.C. players
Llanelli Town A.F.C. players
Weston-super-Mare A.F.C. players
Oxford City F.C. players
Weymouth F.C. players
Brackley Town F.C. players
Santos F.C. (South Africa) players
Bidvest Wits F.C. players
Chippa United F.C. players
Lamontville Golden Arrows F.C. players
Harare City F.C. players
English expatriate sportspeople in South Africa
English expatriate sportspeople in Zimbabwe
Expatriate footballers in Zimbabwe
English expatriate footballers